The Northrop Grumman E-10 MC2A was planned as a multi-role military aircraft to replace the Boeing 707-based E-3 Sentry and E-8 Joint STARS, the Boeing 747-based E-4B, and the RC-135 Rivet Joint aircraft in US military service. The E-10 was based on the Boeing 767-400ER commercial airplane.

Development
In 2003, the Northrop Grumman, Boeing, and Raytheon MC2A team was awarded a $215 million contract for pre-SDD (System Development and Demonstration) development of the aircraft.  MC2A is an acronym for Multi-Sensor Command and Control Aircraft. The MC2A was intended to be the ultimate theater-wide combat control center.

While the Northrop Grumman E-8 Joint STARS aircraft was a recent development, it is the last such type based on the 707. Installing the high technology systems envisaged for the MC2A on an increasingly obsolete airframe would not provide the capability required. The availability of powerful and reliable turbofans allowed a twinjet to be considered.

In August 2003, Air International reported that the goal of integrating air- and ground-search radars on a single airframe was abandoned. Electronic interference between the active electronically scanned array (AESA) and ground-surveillance radars as well as the power requirements for both systems were cited as the reason. Instead the USAF decided to plan two separate E-10 fleets to be integrated with the proposed space-based radar system, air- and space-based ELINT/SIGINT assets, and space-based IMINT satellites. It would have been the central command authority for all air, land, and sea forces in a combat theater. The E-10 was also considered for use as a command center for unmanned combat air vehicles.

The capability of the MC2A was to be raised incrementally, with each phase known as a "spiral".
 Spiral 1  Multi-Platform Radar Technology Insertion Program (MP-RTIP): This version would have provided substantial Joint Cruise Missile Defense (CMD) capability with focused AMTI modes and augment the E-8 Joint STARS in the ground surveillance role.
 Spiral 2  AWACS Capability: This version would have replaced the E-3. It was expected that the Spiral 2 version would use a variant of the Boeing Wedgetail's Multi-role Electronically Scanned Array.
 Spiral 3  SIGINT Platform: This version was intended to replace a wide range of SIGINT/ELINT aircraft. Beyond conceptual studies and preliminary research, this version was not being actively designed.

Scale-back and cancellation
In January 2006, the Air Force FY07 budget request revealed a reshaping of the E-10 program with the cancellation of the SDD program.  Funding was maintained for the development and testing of a single demonstration aircraft, now known as the E-10A Technology Development Program (TDP). The TDP phase would flight test the MP-RTIP Wide-Area Surveillance (WAS) radar, and conduct flight demonstrations of the E-10A's Cruise Missile Defense (CMD) Capability.  The SDD elimination was designed to be a cost-cutting measure and part of a larger reorganization and redefinition of the Air Force's mission including the retirement of the Boeing E-4B and Lockheed F-117A Nighthawk fleets, as well as the elimination of all but 58 Boeing B-52H Stratofortresses.

The E-10 finally disappeared at the end of FY2007 as budget pressures and competing priorities pushed it completely out of the budget. The USAF maintained funding for the MP-RTIP radar and may eventually put the radar on the E-8, or on a new aircraft, possibly the same airframe as the next aerial tanker.  The smaller version of the MP-RTIP AESA radar designed to be flown on the Northrop Grumman RQ-4B Global Hawk is being flight tested on the Scaled Composites Proteus aircraft.  Boeing had kept the E-10 prototype (767-400ER) at Paine Field in Everett, Washington, until it was sold to Bahrain in January 2009 for conversion into a VIP transport.

Specifications (767-400ER with PW4000 engines)

See also

References

External links 
 E-10 MC2A page on Globalsecurity.org
 E-10A page on Deagel.com

E-10
Boeing military aircraft
Cancelled military aircraft projects of the United States
Twinjets
Low-wing aircraft
AWACS aircraft
Boeing 767